Nokomis Township may refer to the following townships in the United States:

 Nokomis Township, Montgomery County, Illinois
 Nokomis Township, Buena Vista County, Iowa